This is a list of philatelists, persons notable for their contributions to philately.

B

 David Beech MBE FRPSL, "Former President of the Royal Philatelic Society London, Head Curator of the Philatelic Collection of the British Library"
 Oscar Berger-Levrault
 Kasimir Bileski
 Ferdinand of Bulgaria

C

 Gustave Caillebotte
 Samuel Chapman, Mexico
 Daniel Cooper, founder and first president of Philatelic Society of London
 Jal Cooper

D

 Paul Darke, founder of the largest recorded collection of disability themed stamps in the world
 Gerald Davis
 C.D. Desai
 Emilio Diena, ancient Italian state specialist

E

 Robert Brisco Earée, Album Weeds
 Edward B. Evans, "Major Evans"

F

 David Feldman
 Adelaide Lucy Fenton, early female philatelist
 Philipp von Ferrary

G

 Edward Stanley Gibbons, British dealer
 Arthur William Sinclair Gray was an Australian known for his collection of "Kangaroo and Map" stamps
 John Edward Gray
 Colonel Green
 Bill Gross, third person to form a complete 19th-century US collection

H

 Abraham Hatfield, signer of  Roll of Distinguished Philatelists and plater of the New York Postmaster's Provisional
 George Higlett
 Heinrich Himmler
 Arthur Hind

K

 Hiroyuki Kanai, Mauritius collection
 Anatoly Karpov
 George V of the United Kingdom, royal collector
 Adolph Koeppel

L

 Pierre Langlois
 Henry G. Lapham, Grand Award at the 1936 Third International Philatelic Exhibition
 H. Dormer Legge
 Alfred Lichtenstein
 James Lindsay, 26th Earl of Crawford, formed massive philatelic library
 George Ward Linn, founder of Linn's Weekly Stamp News
 Robson Lowe, "father of postal history"
 John Luff

M

 James A. Mackay
 Fred Melville
 Foil A. Miller
 Jean-Baptiste Moens, "father of philately"
 Hedley Adams Mobbs
 Walter Morley
 Edwin Müller
 Douglas Myall

O

 Frank F. Olney (1851–1903), Mayor of Providence, Rhode Island and president of the American Philatelic Association for three terms

P

 Alfred Potiquet, first stamp catalogue

R

 Hakim Syed Zillur Rahman, collector of medical stamps
 Ayn Rand
 Franklin D. Roosevelt, presidential collector
 L.T. Rose-Hutchinson
 Stuart Rossiter
 Gary Ryan

S

 Lawrence L Shenfield, Confederate postal history
 Sir Ernest de Silva, Sri Lanka's greatest philatelist
 Paul Skinner, Head Curator of the Philatelic Collection of the British Library
 Evelyn Arthur Smythies
 William Carlos Stone, revenues and philatelic literature

T

 Thomas Tapling
 Charlotte Tebay, early female philatelist

W

 Leon Norman Williams

Z

 Robert Zoellner, one of two people to form a complete U.S. collection

See also
 Topical stamp collecting

References

Philatelists